Jhangiani is an Indian surname. Notable people with the surname include:

Dimple Jhangiani (born 1990), Indian television actress 
Preeti Jhangiani (born 1980), Indian model and actress

Indian surnames